The Calosphaeriales are an order of fungi within the class Sordariomycetes containing 2 families. They are saprophytes and have small fruiting bodies.

Subdivision

Family Calosphaeriaceae
Calosphaeria
Calosphaeriophora
Jattaea
Kacosphaeria
Pachytrype
Phaeocrella
Phragmocalosphaeria
Togniniella
Wegelina
Family Pleurostomataceae
Pleurostoma
Pleurostomophora
incertae Sedis
Conidiotheca
Sulcatistroma

References 

 
Ascomycota orders
Taxa named by Margaret Elizabeth Barr-Bigelow
Taxa described in 1983